Massimo Bonomi (born 22 June 1967, in Brescia) is a former Italian rugby union player and a sports manager. He played as a centre.

Bonomi played for Rugby Brescia (1985/86-1989/90), Amatori Rugby Milano (1990/91-1997/98), where he won 4 titles of the Italian Championship, in 1990/91, 1992/93, 1994/95 and 1995/96, and the Cup of Italy, in 1994/95, being a key player for the team, Amatori Calvisano (1998/99-2002/03), and Poncarale (2003/04-2006/07), where he would finish his career, aged 40 years old.

Bonomi had 34 caps for Italy, from 1988 to 1996, scoring 6 tries, 5 conversions, 13 penalties and 5 drop goals, 93 points in aggregate. He played at the 1991 Rugby World Cup, in two games, scoring a try in the 21-31 loss to New Zealand, and at the 1995 Rugby World Cup, in one game.

References

External links

1967 births
Living people
Italian rugby union players
Italy international rugby union players
Amatori Rugby Milano players
Rugby Calvisano players
Rugby union centres